Speedy Smith is a 1927 American silent drama film directed by Duke Worne and starring Billy Sullivan, Hazel Deane and Harry Tenbrook.

Synopsis
In order to raise money for his girlfriend's mother to have a vital operation, Billy Smith accepts the challenge of boxer Slugger Sampson to last three rounds with him to win prize money.

Cast
 Billy Sullivan as Billy Smith
 Hazel Deane as Tena Lucian
 Harry Tenbrook as Slugger Sampson
 Virginia True Boardman as Widow Lucian
 George Periolat as Charles C. Smith
 Arthur Thalasso as James Mortimer Dorfee

References

Bibliography
 Munden, Kenneth White. The American Film Institute Catalog of Motion Pictures Produced in the United States, Part 1. University of California Press, 1997.

External links
 

1927 films
1927 drama films
1920s English-language films
American silent feature films
American boxing films
Silent American drama films
Films directed by Duke Worne
Rayart Pictures films
1920s American films
English-language drama films